Henri Guissou (17 November 1910, Koudougou, French Upper Volta – 22 May 1979, Koudougou) was a Burkinabé politician and diplomat.

Henri Guissou was senator from Côte d'Ivoire from 1947 to 1948, and member for French Upper Volta to the National Assembly of France from 1949 to 1959, Guissou also served in the French Senate from 1947 to 1948. From 1948 to 1952 he was member for Koudougou of the Territorial Assembly of French Upper Volta. A political leader of the Voltaic Union, he founded the Social Party for the Emancipation of the African Masses (PSEMA) with Joseph Conombo in 1955, which joined the Unified Democratic Party (PDU) in the following year. He became a diplomat for the new Republic of Upper Volta: after briefly representing Upper Volta at the United Nations from February to May 1961, he was Ambassador to France from 1961 to 1964, Ambassador to West Germany from 1966 to 1976, and Ambassador to France from 1966 until his retirement in 1976.

He was the father of Joséphine Ouédraogo, a Burkinabé female politician who served as a minister during the presidency of Thomas Sankara and Michel Kafando.

References

External Links
 Henri Guissou on the French National Assembly website
 Henri Guissou on the French Senate website

1910 births
1979 deaths
People from Centre-Ouest Region
Unified Democratic Party politicians
French Senators of the Fourth Republic
Senators of French West Africa
Deputies of the 1st National Assembly of the French Fourth Republic
Deputies of the 2nd National Assembly of the French Fourth Republic
Deputies of the 3rd National Assembly of the French Fourth Republic
Deputies of the 1st National Assembly of the French Fifth Republic
Ambassadors of Burkina Faso to France
Ambassadors of Burkina Faso to West Germany
Permanent Representatives of Burkina Faso to the United Nations
Burkinabé diplomats